Thoonga Nagaram is a 2011 Indian Tamil-language action thriller film written and directed by debutant Gaurav Narayanan, starring himself along with Vimal, Bharani, Nishanth, and Anjali. The film, produced by Dhayanidhi Alagiri's Cloud Nine Movies, was shot entirely in Madurai, the city where the story takes place and which the title refers to. It was released on 4 February 2011 to relatively positive reviews and excellent box office collection. The film was dubbed in Telugu under the title Naluguru Snehithula Katha.

Plot 
Kannan (Vimal), Ayyavu (Bharani), Rajamani (Gaurav Narayanan), and Mariappan (Nishanth) are four friends who live their lives in their own way in Madurai. They are callous youths who go hammer and tongs to make both ends meet. Kannan, a wedding videographer, comes across his cousin Radha (Anjali), who is a compere in a local cable TV channel, and love blossoms between them. However, one event changes the course of their life. Kannan bashes a youth for taking obscene video clippings of a girl and blackmailing her with ulterior motive. The youth’s father (Kamala theatre owner Raju) finds out the men behind the attack on his son. He hatches a conspiracy and ensures that the friends themselves turn foes for each other. In the meantime, it is time for Kannan to tie the knot with Radha. Did the baddie succeed in his mission is the crux of the story.

Cast 

 Vimal as Thavuttu Raja (Kannan)
Master Sachin as young Kannan
 Anjali as Kalaivani (Radha/Theru Trisha)
 Bharani as Ayyavu
 Gaurav Narayanan as Rajamani
 Nishanth as Mariappan
 V. N. Chidambaram as Periya Thappa
 Arun Kumar as Periya Thappa Brother
 Subbu Panchu
 Pandu
 Yogi Babu as Radha's fan
 Lizzie Antony as Thahsildar's wife
 Singampuli
 Soori as Address informer for Theru Trisha
 Krishnamoorthy
 Madhumitha as Special Appearance
 Vadivelu as Special Appearance

Box office
The film was a commercial success grossing nearly $2million at the box office in 6 weeks.

Soundtrack 

The soundtrack consists of seven tracks including one remix number from Penn tuned by Sundar C. Babu. It was released by Think Music and the audio launch took place on 5 January 2011 at Sathyam Cinemas. Directors Sasikumar, KV Anand, Samuthirakani, Gautham Menon, Lingusamy, Ameer, KS Ravikumar, producer Dhayanidhi Alagiri were the chief guests. The soundtrack received positive reviews.

References

External links
 

2011 films
Indian gangster films
Films shot in Madurai
2010s Tamil-language films
Films scored by Sundar C. Babu
2011 directorial debut films